Jibon O Rajnaitik Bastobota is a Bengali novel by Shahidul Zahir. It was published in Dhaka by Mowla Brothers in 1988 as a debut noble by Zahir. The novella is written against the backdrop of Bangladesh Liberation War in 1971.

In popular culture
A play with the same title based on this novel was performed in Dhaka directed by dramatist Syed Jamil Ahmed. The inaugural show was held on 23 March 2019, on the death anniversary of Zaheer.

References

1988 books
1988 novels
Bengali-language novels
Novels by Shahidul Zahir
Bangladeshi political novels